The 1992 U.S. Figure Skating Championships took place at the Orlando Arena in Orlando, Florida. Medals were awarded in four colors: gold (first), silver (second), bronze (third), and pewter (fourth) in six disciplines – men's singles, ladies' singles, pair skating, ice dancing, men's figures and ladies's figures – across three levels: senior, junior, and novice.

The event determined the U.S. teams for the 1992 Winter Olympics and 1992 World Championships.

Senior results

Men

Men's figures

Ladies

Ladies' figures

Pairs

Ice dancing
(incomplete standings)

Junior results

Men

Men's figures

Ladies

Ladies' figures

Pairs

Ice dancing
(incomplete standings)

Novice results

Men

Men's figures

Ladies

Ladies' figures

Pairs

Ice dancing

References

External links
 Men's and ladies' results

U.S. Figure Skating Championships
United States Figure Skating Championships, 1992
United States Figure Skating Championships, 1992
United States Figure Skating Championships, 1992
January 1992 sports events in the United States